Mir-2 was a Soviet space station project which began in February 1976. Some of the modules built for Mir-2 have been incorporated into the International Space Station (ISS). The project underwent many changes, but was always based on the DOS-8 base block space station core module, built as a back-up to the DOS-7 base block used in the Mir station. The DOS-8 base block was eventually used as the Zvezda module of the ISS. Its design lineage extends back to the original Salyut stations.

Project history

The evolution of the Mir-2 project

1981 to 1987: KB Salyut Mir-2
The prototype of the central module was as Polyus. Mir-2 would be capable of docking at least four modules in ordinary operation.

December 14, 1987: NPO Energia Mir-2
Designated as OSETS (Orbital Assembly and Operations Centre). The station would be built in a 65 degree orbit and consist of 90 ton modules.
Launch 1 - DOS 8, providing housing for the assembly crew.
Launch 2 - 90 ton module.
Launch 3 - Truss and solar arrays.
Launches 4 to 6 - additional 90 ton modules.

1991: "Mir-1.5"
This would involve launch of the DOS-8, after which the Buran shuttle would grapple the module, rendezvous with Mir, and attach it to the old DOS-7 base block. This plan was later altered so that
DOS-8 would maneuver and dock itself to Mir. It would remain attached for two years.

1992: "Mir-2"
The station would consist of the DOS-8 core module and a cross beam called the NEP (Science Power Platform). This was equipped with MSB retractable solar panels, Sfora thruster packages and small scientific packages.

Four 3 to 4 ton modules were planned:

Docking Module - with the APDS universal androgynous docking system, and a side hatch for space walks
Resource Module - Equipped with gyrodynes for orienting the station and a passive docking port for docking of Soyuz or Progress ferry spacecraft
Technology Module - with materials experiments
Biotechnology Module

November 1993: International Space Station built around Mir-2

Russian elements of the International Space Station include:

Zarya FGB, the first element launched. This was a US-funded TKS-derived propulsion module built by KB Salyut.
Zvezda Service Module - this is the DOS-8 station, which was launched as the third major ISS module in July 2000.
SO-1 (Pirs) - one of the docking modules originally designed for Buran/Mir-2 was added to the station in September 2001.
SO-2 Poisk - A module similar to Pirs. Poisk also provides extra space for scientific experiments, and power-supply outlets and data-transmission interfaces for external scientific payloads.
Rassvet - the only module delivered by NASA shuttle, in a barter exchange for the launch 'owed' for Zarya. Rassvet is used for cargo storage, science, and as a docking port for visiting spacecraft.

References

External links
Mir-2 on Astronautix
Mir-2

Cancelled space stations
Cancelled Soviet spacecraft